Hockey Club Rotterdam, commonly known as Rotterdam is a Dutch field hockey club based in Rotterdam, South Holland. It was founded on 16 September 1925.

The first men's team competes on the highest level of the Dutch field hockey league, which is called "Hoofdklasse" and the first women's team competes in the second tier called the Promotieklasse. HC Rotterdam plays their matches in the 3,500-capacity Hazelaarweg Stadion, which also hosted the 2001 Men's Champions Trophy and the 2005 Men's Hockey Junior World Cup.

Honours

Men
Hoofdklasse
 Winners (1): 2012–13
 Runners-up (2): 2011–12, 2016–17
Euro Hockey League
 Runners-up (1): 2009–10
Hoofdklasse Indoor
 Winners (2): 2007–08, 2013–14
EuroHockey Indoor Club Challenge I
 Winners (1): 2015

Women
Hoofdklasse
 Runners-up (2): 2000–01, 2001–02
KNHB Cup
 Winners (1): 1995
EuroHockey Cup Winners Cup
 Winners (2): 2002, 2003
Hoofdklasse Indoor
 Winners (3): 1998–99, 1999–00, 2000–01
EuroHockey Indoor Club Trophy
 Winners (1): 2001
EuroHockey Indoor Club Challenge I
 Winners (1): 2000

Players

Men's squad
Head coach: Albert Kees Maneschijn

Notable players

Men's internationals

 Mark Knowles

 Jeffrey Thys

 Ranjeev Deol
 Peter Short
 Rob Short
/
 Alastair Brogdon
 Adam Dixon
 Harry Martin

 Michael Darling
 Sean Murray

 Ryan Archibald
 Phil Burrows
 Simon Child
 Blair Tarrant
 Nick Wilson

 Sohail Abbas 
 Waseem Ahmed

Women's internationals

 Jimena Cedrés
 Cecilia Rognoni

 Kate Hollywood
/
 Susie Gilbert
 Helen Grant
 Beth Storry
/
 Sarah Thomas

References

External links 
 Official website of HC Rotterdam

 
Rotterdam
Rotterdam
1925 establishments in the Netherlands
Sports clubs in Rotterdam